Gustave III, ou Le bal masqué (Gustavus III, or The Masked Ball) is an opéra historique or grand opera in five acts by Daniel Auber, with a libretto by Eugène Scribe.

Performance history
It received its first performance at the Salle Le Peletier of the Paris Opéra on 27 February 1833, with costumes designed by Eugène Lami and Paul Lormier, and sets by Léon Feuchère (act 1 and act 5, scene 2), Jules Diéterle (act 2), Alfred (act 3), Pierre-Luc-Charles Ciceri (act 4), René-Humanité Philastre and Charles-Antoine Cambon (act 5, scene 1). The opera was a major success for the composer, with 168 performances until 1853.

Ellen Creathorne Clayton has translated French critic Jules Janin's description of the last act, which was often presented separately from the opera, as follows:
"I believe ... that never, even at the Opéra, was seen a spectacle more grand, more rich, more curious, more magnificent, that the fifth act of Gustave. It is a fairlyland of beautiful women, of gauze, of velvet, of grotesqueness, of elegance, of good taste and of bad taste, of details, of learned researches, of esprit, of madness and of whimsicality – of every thing in a word, which is suggestive of the eighteenth century. When the beautiful curtain is raised, you find yourself in an immense ballroom." The stage of the Grand Opéra, the largest in Paris, is admirably adapted for masked balls, and the side-scenes being removed, the stage was surrounded a salon, the decorations of which corresponded with those of the boxes. "This salle de bal is overlooked by boxes, these boxes are filled with masks, who play the part of spectators. At their feet, constantly moving, is the circling crowd, disguised in every imaginable costume, and dominoes of every conceivable hue. Harlequins of all fashions, clowns, peddlers, what shall I say? One presents the appearance of a tub, another of a guitar; his neighbor is disguised en botte d'asperges; that one is a mirror, this a fish; there is a bird, here is a time-piece – you can hardly imagine the infinite confusion. Peasants, marquises, princes, monks, I know not what, mingle in one rainbow-hued crowd. It is impossible to describe this endless madness, this whirl, this bizarrerie, on which the rays of two thousand wax tapers, in their crustal lustres, pour an inundation of mellow light. I, who am so well accustomed to spectacles like this – I, who am, unfortunately, not easily disposed to be surprised – I am yet dazzled with this radiant scene."

Roles 
{| class="wikitable"
|+
!Role
!Voice type
!Premiere cast, 27 February 1833(Conductor: – )
|-
|Gustave III, King of Sweden
|tenor
|Adolphe Nourrit
|-
|Ankastrom, his friend
||bass
|Nicolas-Prosper Levasseur
|-
|Amélie, Countess of Ankastrom, in love with Gustave
|soprano
|Cornélie Falcon
|-
|Oscar, the King's page
|soprano
|Julie Dorus-Gras
|-
|Arvedson, fortune teller|mezzo-soprano
|Louise-Zulmé Dabadie-Leroux
|-
|Dehorn, conspirator|bass
|Henri-Bernard Dabadie
|-
|Warting, conspirator|tenor
|Alexis Dupont
|-
|A chamberlain
|tenor
|Hyacinthe Trévaux
|-
|Armfelt, Minister of Justice|bass
|Ferdinand Prévost
|-
|Général Kaulbart, Minister of War|bass
|Pierre-François Wartel
|-
|Christian
|tenor
|Jean-Étienne-Auguste Massol
|-
|A servant of Ankastrom
|singer
|François-Alphonse Hens
|-
|Roslin, painter|silent
|Ferdinand
|-
|Sergell, sculptor|silent
|Henri
|-
| colspan="3" |Chorus: courtiers, deputies of state, military officers in the service of the King, royal guards, sailors, soldiers, people|}

Synopsis
Place: Stockholm
Time: 15 and 16 March 1792

The opera concerns some aspects of the real-life assassination of Gustav III, King of Sweden.

The major aspects of the plot can be found first in Giuseppe Verdi's planned opera, Gustavo III, which was never performed as written, but whose major elements were incorporated into a revised version of the story in the opera which eventually became Un ballo in maschera.

RecordingsGustave III: Laurence Dale, Christian Treguier, French Lyrique Orchestra; Intermezzo Vocal Ensemble, conducted by Michel Swierczewski (Arion, 1993)
The overture and ballet music from Gustave III appears at the end of the second disc of Richard Bonynge's recording of Auber's Le domino noir.

References
Notes

Sources

 
 
 
 
 
 

Further reading
Budden, Julian,  The Operas of Verdi, Volume 2:  From Il Trovatore to La Forza del destino. London: Cassell, 1984.  (hardcover)   (paperback).
 Schneider, Herbert (1992). "Gustave III", vol. 2, pp. 583–584, in The New Grove Dictionary of Opera, ed. Stanley Sadie. London: Macmillan. .

External links 
 
 Visual documentation of the premiere on Gallica

Grand operas
French-language operas
Operas by Daniel Auber
Operas
1833 operas
Opera world premieres at the Paris Opera
Operas set in Sweden
Operas based on real people
Operas set in the 18th century
Libretti by Eugène Scribe
Cultural depictions of Gustav III